Laelia coenosa, the reed tussock, is a moth of the family Erebidae. The species was first described by Jacob Hübner in 1808. It is found in North Africa, southern and central Europe, through Russia and eastern Asia up to Japan.

The wingspan is 35–50 mm. In the male the forewings are whitish ochreous, brownish tinged, especially towards the costa. There is a very indistinct fuscous discal dot and a posterior series of several fuscous dots between veins. The hindwings are whitish, towards apex brownish tinged. In the female the forewings and hindwings are whitish. Larva blackish, hairs yellowish; pencils on 2 and 12 brownish or blackish, tufts on 5 through 8 yellowish.

The larvae primarily feed on Phragmites australis and Phragmites communis, but also Festuca, Carex and Cladium species. The moth flies from July to August depending on the location.

References

External links

"Laelia coenosa (Hübner, 1808)". Fauna Europaea. Retrieved 15 May 2020.
"10410 Laelia coenosa (Hübner, [1808]) - Schilf-Bürstenspinner, Gelbbein". Lepiforum e. V. Retrieved 15 May 2020.

Lymantriinae
Moths of Africa
Moths of Asia
Moths of Europe
Moths described in 1808
Taxa named by Jacob Hübner